
Year 282 BC was a year of the pre-Julian Roman calendar. At the time it was known as the Year of the Consulship of Luscinus and Papus (or, less frequently, year 472 Ab urbe condita). The denomination 282 BC for this year has been used since the early medieval period, when the Anno Domini calendar era became the prevalent method in Europe for naming years.

Events

By place

Asia Minor 
 The city of Pergamum in Asia Minor ends its allegiance to Lysimachus. Its ruler, Philetaerus, transfers his allegiance, as well as the important fortress of Pergamon and his treasury, to Seleucus, who allows him a far larger measure of independence than he had hitherto enjoyed.

Roman Republic 
 The Battle of Populonia is fought between Rome and the Etruscans. The Romans are victorious and, as a result, the Etruscan threat to Rome is sharply diminished.
 The Magna Graecia city of Thurii appeals to Rome for help against the native Italian tribes. Though the Roman Senate hesitates, the plebeian Assembly decides to respond. Thurii is saved, but Tarentum, jealous of Rome's interference, attacks and sinks some Roman ships entering its harbour. Roman envoys, sent to protest, are mistreated.
 Rome declares war on Tarentum. King Pyrrhus of Epirus declares his willingness to come to the aid of Tarentum. Tarentum also looks for support from the Samnites and other Italian tribes in southern Italy.

Egypt 
 Arsinoe, daughter of Lysimachus, king of Thrace, marries Ptolemy II of Egypt as part of the alliance between Thrace and Egypt against Seleucus.

Births

Deaths 
 Ptolemy I Soter, Macedonian military general who served under Alexander the Great and became ruler of Egypt (born c.367)

References